Portrait with Keys is a book by the South African writer Ivan Vladislavic. It is a portrait of life in Johannesburg – and "what-what": home, habit, change, memory, mortality, friendship, ghosts, gardens, walking, falling, selling, stealing ... Neither a novel nor a collection of short stories, the book consists of 138 short texts organised in two parts – Point A and Point B – followed by Notes and Sources, Itineraries and an Author's Note. Written by a consummate literary artist, this is a unique dossier of city life and a selective self-portrait of the author – in Vladislavic's words, “a bit like a map that shows only the side streets”.

"Memory takes root only half in the folds of the brain: half’s in the concrete streets we’ve lived along." – Lionel Abrahams, poet and author.

From Portrait with Keys, Point A, section 68: 
“In Johannesburg, the Venice of the South, the backdrop is always a man-made one. We have planted a forest the birds endorse. For hills we have mine dumps covered with grass. We do not wait for time and the elements to weather us, we change scenery ourselves, to suit our moods. Nature is for other people, in other places ...”

"The major themes of Portrait with Keys ... are the I-beams that make up the chassis. Subsidiary themes, such as crime and art and architecture, are the brakes and suspension ... The little snippets – for instance, the list of car-guards’ notes – are the city's rivets and bolts exploded out along their dotted diameters."
- William Dicey, author and book designer.

Reviews
 The Weekender
 Mail & Guardian
 The Star Tonight
 The Citizen

South African books